The Austin Peay Governors football program is the intercollegiate American football team for Austin Peay State University (Peay or APSU), located in the U.S. state of Tennessee. The team competes in the NCAA Division I Football Championship Subdivision (FCS) and played the most recent 2022 season as members of the ASUN Conference. For the 2023 season and beyond, Peay will play in the ASUN–WAC Football Conference, created shortly after the 2022 season by the merger of the football leagues of the ASUN and Western Athletic Conference. The school's first football team was fielded in 1930. They were previously a member of the Ohio Valley Conference (1963-1996, 2007-2021) and the Pioneer Football League (2001-2005). Austin Peay Governors football plays its home games at the 10,000 seat Fortera Stadium.

History

Classifications
1957–1972: NCAA College Division
1973–1977: NCAA Division II
1978–present: NCAA Division I–AA/FCS

Conference memberships
1930–1946: Independent
1947–1962: Volunteer State Athletic Conference
1963–1996: Ohio Valley Conference
1997–2000: NCAA Division I–AA Independent
2001–2005: Pioneer Football League
2006: NCAA Division I FCS Independent
2007–2021: Ohio Valley Conference
2022: ASUN Conference
2023–present: ASUN–WAC Football Conference

Though not competing in OVC football from 1997–2006, Peay remained a full OVC member during this period.

Rivalries

Sgt. York Trophy 
The trophy goes to the team in Tennessee that has the best record against the other three teams. Austin Peay has won the trophy three times, in 2017, 2018, and 2019.

Battle of the Border 
The battle of the border is a trophy awarded to the team with the most points based on wins between all the sporting events between Austin Peay and Murray State. Murray State leads the series 36-16.

Notable former players
Notable alumni include:

 Jeff Gooch
 Michael Swift
 Kirk Pointer
 Kyran Moore
 Bonnie Sloan, first deaf player in NFL history
 Percy Howard (whose only NFL TD catch came in Super Bowl X, as a member of the Dallas Cowboys)
 Lewis Lastik, featured actor in Remember the Titans, offensive lineman. (Also member of the APSU track and field teams, shot put, and javelin.)

Retired numbers

Austin Peay has retired two jersey numbers in program history.

Honored jerseys
Numbers honored, but not retired and available for future players:

Conference championships
Austin Peay has won four conference championships, two outright, and two shared with Southeast Missouri State in the OVC, Central Arkansas and Eastern Kentucky in the ASUN

Postseason

FCS playoffs
The Governors have made one appearance in the FCS Playoffs, their first being in 2019; their record is 2–1.

References

External links
 

 
American football teams established in 1930
1930 establishments in Tennessee